The Variable Annuity Life Insurance Company, or VALIC, a subsidiary of American International Group, Inc.,  (AIG), is an insurance corporation that specializes in tax-qualified retirement plans, supplemental tax-deferred and after-tax investments.

VALIC's headquarters are in Houston, Texas. VALIC ranks in the top 10 of all U.S. and Canadian life insurance companies, based on more than $86 billion in total customer assets under management as of December 31, 2014. The company is a certified member of the Insurance Marketplace Standards Association (IMSA).

Organization 
As of December 31, 2014, VALIC has more than $86 billion in total customer assets under management and manages plans for nearly 24,000 groups serving more than 2 million plan participants in 41,000 locations in the U.S. VALIC represents The Variable Annuity Life Insurance Company and its subsidiaries, VALIC Financial Advisors, Inc. and VALIC Retirement Services Company.

Products 
VALIC offers a variety of products, including:

 Mutual fund programs
 Fixed, variable and income annuities
 Asset management programs
 Life insurance
 Brokerage accounts
 College savings plans
 Group and Individual retirement accounts—Traditional IRA, Roth IRA, Spousal IRA, Money Market Consolidator

Sponsoring 
The company supports
 the National Distinguished Principals Program (NAESP)
 the AASA National Superintendent of the Year Award
 exclusively the Strategic Partner ASBO Certificate of Excellence Award.

See also
 AIG Advisor Group
 American International Group

References

External links
VALIC Website
Retirement and pension
AIG Retirement Google Finance

Financial services companies of the United States
Insurance companies of the United States
Companies based in Houston